Katcha may refer to:
 Katcha, Sudan, a village in the Nuba Mountains Region in the south of Sudan
 Katcha, Togo, a village in the Bassar Prefecture in the Kara Region 
 Katcha, Nigeria, a Local Government Area in Niger State
 Katcha language, a dialect of Kadugli in Sudan

Persons
Vahé Katcha (1928-2003), French Armenian novelist, screenwriter and journalist

See also
Katchal (disambiguation)